Östra Småland, also known as Östran, was a local newspaper based in Kalmar, Sweden. The paper was in circulation between 1928 and 2019.

History and profile
Östra Småland was started in 1928. The paper was owned by the Swedish Social Democratic Party. It was published by Östra Småland AB, a subsidiary of Gota Media AB. The paper had a social democratic political stance. It was published in tabloid format.

In the second half of the 1950s Östra Småland enjoyed higher levels of circulation. In December 2019 the paper ceased publication due to low profitability.

References

1928 establishments in Sweden
2019 disestablishments in Sweden
Defunct newspapers published in Sweden
Mass media in Kalmar
Publications established in 1928
Publications disestablished in 2019
Swedish-language newspapers